Danowita is a small town in the western province of Sri Lanka. The A1 highway passes by Danowita. Bandaranaike International Airport is the nearest airport.

Nearby cities 
 Warakapola – 
 Mirigama – 
 Pasyala – 
 Nittambuwa – 
 Kurunagala – 
 Colombo – 
 Kandy –

Demographics 
Buddhism is the largest religion in Danowita, which contains some Buddhist temples. Hinduism and Christianity are also represented.

Language 
The common languages of Danowita, depending on social classes, social circles, and ethnic backgrounds are Sinhalese, Tamil and English.

Religion 
Notable Buddhist temples near Danowita

 Kande Viharaya
 Bothale Sri Gotabaya Rajamaha Viharaya
 Kinithulagala Aranya Senasanaya
 Waduwaththa Temple

Economy 
The economy of Danowita is largely driven by farming. Crops include rubber, coconut, tea, paddy, papper, pineapple, and betel.

Climate 
Danowita has a tropical monsoon climate under the Köppen climate classification. The climate is fairly temperate all throughout the year with a significant rainfall . Even in the driest month there is a significant amount of rain. The driest month is January and there is about 62 mm of precipitation. Most of the precipitation in Danowita area falls in October, averaging 365 mm. The precipitation varies 303 mm between the driest month and the wettest month. April is warmest month in Danowita, with an average temperature of 28.4 °C (83.1 °F) and the  December is the coldest month, with temperatures averaging 26.1 °C (79 °F). Throughout the year, temperatures vary by 2.3 °C.

Education
Education is free for all students who study in government schools. Schools in Danowita and the nearby area include:

Government schools
 Danowita Maha Vidyalaya
 Keenadeniya Maha Vidyalaya
 Madabawita Kanishta Vidyalya
 Bothale Kanistha Vidyalaya
 Keenadeniya Primary College

Private Schools
 Royal International College Warakapola
 Oxfard College Warakapola
 Majesty International School Warakapola

Transportation
Danowita is near the A1 road, and lies on bus routes to Colombo ,Galle, Hambantota, Kandy, Trincomalee, Anuradhapura, and Jaffna.
More than 45 daily buses are operated from Danowita - Mirigama.
 
Road Transport
A-Grade highways

A1 highway(Colombo road) which connects main cites Colombo and Kandy
A6 highway(Kurunegala) The road is six km away and it connects with main cities Kurunegala and Trincomalee

Expressways
E04 is under construction and it is six km away

Central Expressway Construction

Under the directives of MoHEH, RDA has initiated a study to find out a suitable road corridor to construct the expressway from Kadawatha to Dambulla via Kurunegala under Central Expressway Project. The second stage of the construction of the Central Expressway Project (CEP Project-2) from Meerigama to Kurunegala was launched on 1 February, 2017. Subsequently, the expressway will cross Gampaha, Meerigama, Kurunegala while ending at Dambulla. The project has been implemented in four stages; from Kadawatha to Mirigama (37 km), Mirigama to Kurunegala (39.28 km), Pothuhera to Galagedara (32.5 km) and Kurunegala to Dambulla (60.3 km).

Bus routes via Danowita:
Route Number 15 – Colombo to Jaffna
Route Number 15 – Colombo to Anuradhapura and Vavuniya
Route Number 57 – Colombo to Anuradhapura
Route Number 49 – Colombo to Trincomalee
Route Number 01 – Colombo to Kandy
Route Number 48 – Colombo to Polonnaruwa
Route Number 08 – Colombo to Matale

Rail Transport
Nearest railway station is Mirigama railway station. It is six km away from Danowita. Buses are operated from Danowita to Mirigama, So it is easy to go to the station. This station is on the main rail way line. Ambepussa railway station is also seven kilometers away.

 
Air Transport:
The city is about 40.5 km to the Bandaranaike International Airport and 65 km to Ratmalana Airport.

References

Populated places in Gampaha District